Menteng Pulo Cemetery is a Dutch war cemetery at Jl. Menteng Pulo RT. 3 RW. 12, Menteng Dalam, Tebet, Jakarta in Indonesia. It is one of two Dutch war cemeteries in Jakarta, the other one is Ereveld Ancol at Ancol. Evereld Menteng Pulo was built to accommodate the victims of the war from the Japanese occupation during Second World War.

History

It was built in L-shaped waqif land provided by the Djakarta government at that time. Menteng Pulo Cemetery was designed by Lt. Col. HA. van Oerle from the First Division December 7 in 1946. The laying of the first foundation was carried out by Lieutenant General Hendrik Simon Spoor when he was still the highest Dutch military leader in the East Indies or Indonesia. There are about 4,300 graves of Royal East Indies army members, who were killed during the Indonesian War of Independence, and victims of the Japanese concentration camp atrocities during World War II. Not only Dutch but native Indonesians were also buried here who were members of Koninklijk Nederlands Indische Leger (KNIL) or the Royal Dutch Indies Army. From 1946 to 1950, there were only 22 graves there. However, since 1960, Menteng Pulo has become a tomb for bodies that have been moved from several regions in Indonesia such as Banjarmasin, Tarakan, Balikpapan, Manado, Makassar, Palembang, and Cililitan. The graves in this cemetery are arranged in eighteen blocks

Besides the thousands of tombs of victims of the Second World War, at Ereveld Menteng Pulo there are several monuments that are characteristic. The two buildings are the Simultaan Church in which there are crosses from bearing rails taken from the Burma railroad track. The church which is not only used for prayers but also as a place of commemoration and ceremonies for all religions, as well as the Columbarium which stores ashes of 754 Dutch military who died as prisoners of war.

References

External links

  Cemetery profile at the OGS website
  Brochure about Ereveld Menteng Pulo

Cemeteries in Jakarta
Military monuments and memorials